Atout France, the France Tourism Development Agency (formerly Maison de la France, the French National Tourist Office), is the French organisation responsible for promoting France as a tourism destination.

History
Atout France was created on 22 July 2009 for the development and modernization of tourism services in France. It was created by merging Maison de la France, an agency that promotes the French culture abroad, and ODIT France, a tourism engineering company.

This merger brought together all the functions of promotion including campaigns, press campaigns, canvassing and tourism engineering such as diagnosis, development plans, project management assistance etc. under a single entity to strengthen the positioning of French tourism.

Status
The agency is placed under the supervision of the Minister of Tourism, Government of France.

Its status as an economic interest group reflects the desire to carry out the public service mission of the Ministry of Tourism in partnership with the State, Central Administrations and local authorities, and the tourism professions, including the major French and foreign industrial and commercial groups involved in tourism. As of 2022, Atout France has total 1,300 partners both from public and private tourism professionals.

The General Assembly of the EIG is chaired by the Minister or Secretary of State for Tourism. Its board of directors has 36 members, one third of whom are representatives of the State and two thirds of whom are tourism professionals, and elects a president. Based on the proposal of the board, the Minister appoints a Director General.

From 2012 to 2015, its president was François Huwart. From November 2015 to April 2019, Philippe Faure served as its president. From May 2009 to April 2019, its director general was Christian Mantei. He became President in April 2019.

References

External links
 

Organizations based in Paris
Tourism in France
Tourism agencies